Sar Eshgaft or Sar Eshkaft or Sareshgaft or Sar Eshkoft may refer to:
 Sar Eshkaft, Andimeshk
 Sar Eshkoft, Bagh-e Malek
 Sar Eshgaft-e Daraki
 Sar Eshgaft, Dezful